Md. Iqbal (1948–18 January 2005) is a Jatiya Party politician and the former Member of Parliament of Pabna-5.

Career
Iqbal was elected to parliament from Pabna-5 as a Jatiya Party candidate in 1988.

References

Jatiya Party (Ershad) politicians
1948 births
4th Jatiya Sangsad members
2005 deaths